Austin Herzog (born August 6, 2002) is an American professional stock car racing driver. He last competed part-time in the ARCA Menards Series West, driving the No. 16 Chevrolet SS for Bill McAnally Racing, and part-time in the ARCA Menards Series, driving the No. 16 Chevrolet SS for the same team.

Racing career

Early career 
Herzog would first race in 2014, at twelve years old, racing in Mini Cups. He raced there for two years, finishing 3rd and 4th in the standings respectably. In 2016, he would make his debut in the 51FIFTY Jr. Late Model Series, getting four wins at Madera Speedway, while getting six fastest lap times. In 2017, he returned to the 51FIFTY Jr. Late Model Series, getting two more wins, and would become the winningest driver in series history. He would make more late model starts later in the season. Herzog would continue to run late model races in 2018, capturing a win at Orange Show Speedway. 2019 would be Herzog's breakout year, as he would win the 2019 Nut Up Pro Late Model Series championship. Along with that, he would get four more wins at Madera Speedway, while getting a runner-up finish in the SRL Southwest Tour.

ARCA Menards Series West 
Herzog would sign with Jefferson Pitts Racing, to drive for only one race in the 2018 NASCAR K&N Pro Series West. He would start eleventh and finish in eighth, earning his first-ever West series top ten. On January 3, 2022, Herzog signed with Bill McAnally Racing, to run the full 2022 ARCA Menards Series West schedule. He will pilot the 16 car, replacing the 2021 West series champion, Jesse Love. On June 30, 2022, it was announced that Landen Lewis will drive the No. 16 car for the remainder of the season, leaving Herzog without a ride.

Personal life 
Herzog was born and raised in Clovis, California. He is a class of 2020 graduate at Clovis High School. His grandfather, Richard, and father, Bryan, also both raced in late model races.

Motorsports career results

ARCA Menards Series
(key) (Bold – Pole position awarded by qualifying time. Italics – Pole position earned by points standings or practice time. * – Most laps led.)

ARCA Menards Series West 
(key) (Bold – Pole position awarded by qualifying time.  – Pole position earned by points standings or practice time. * – Most laps led.)

References

External links 
 

Living people
2002 births
ARCA Menards Series drivers
NASCAR drivers
Racing drivers from California
Racing drivers from Fresno, California
Sportspeople from Fresno, California